The Ottilien or Watam-Awar-Gamay languages languages are a small family of clearly related languages, 
 Watam–Kaian, Gamei (Mbore), and Bosman–Awar.
They are generally classified among the Ramu languages of northern Papua New Guinea.

The Ottilien languages are all spoken in Yawar Rural LLG, in locations mostly along the coast of Madang Province, Papua New Guinea.

Watam and Bosman share plural morphology with Lower Sepik (Nor–Pondo), supporting the Ramu – Lower Sepik language-family proposal.

The family is named for the mouth of the Ottilien River, now known as the Ramu.

Phonemes
Usher (2020) reconstructs the consonant inventory as follows:

{| 
| *m || *n ||  || *ŋ
|-
| *p || *t || *s || *k 
|-
| *mb || *nd || *ndz || *ŋg 
|-
| *w || *ɾ || *j || *ɣ
|}

{| 
|*i||*ɨ||*u
|-
|*e||*ɐ||*o
|-
| ||*a||
|}

Pronouns
Pronouns in proto-Watam-Awar-Gamay (proto-Ottilien) reconstructed by Foley (2005) are:

{| 
!  !! singular !! dual !! plural
|-
! 1st person
|  || *aŋga || *ai
|-
! 2nd person
|  || *(n)oŋgo(a) || *ne
|-
! 3rd person
| *ma(n) || *maniŋg || *mi(n)
|}

See also Lower Ramu languages#Pronouns.

Usher (2020) reconstructs the pronouns as:
{| 
! !!sg!!du!!pl
|-
!1
|  *ŋg[o] || *aŋga || *ai
|-
!2
|  || *[n]oŋga || *ne(-n)
|-
!3
| *ma(-n) ||  || 
|}

Proto-Ottilien
A phonological reconstruction of proto-Watam-Awar-Gamay (proto-Ottilien) has been proposed by Foley (2005).

proto-Watam-Awar-Gamay reconstructions (Foley 2005)

{| class="wikitable sortable"
! gloss !! proto-Watam-Awar-Gamay !! Watam !! Kaian !! Gamay !!  Bosmun !! Awar
|-
| one || *kaku || kaku || kaku || kabe || koku || mbɨnə
|-
| two || *mbuniŋ || mbwoini || mbuniŋ || mbuniŋ || mbuniŋ || mbuni
|-
| three ||  || giramot || giramaut || mbonkak || bonkak || mbribin
|-
| person || *namot || namot || namot || ramot || mot || mot
|-
| woman/mother ||  || aem || meak || meak || mes/mam || məri/mam
|-
| father ||  || aes || aes || aet || sate || sat
|-
| water ||  || arum || ŋarum || puk || mok || mok
|-
| fire || *s(u)ək || sak || sak || tak || suək || suək
|-
| sun || *ra(u) || nau/ra || ra || ra || lau || rau
|-
| moon || *kər(v)i || ndoŋar || kare || karvɨi || kərvi || kəri
|-
| star ||  || gwi || gwae || gwi || ɲjem || pot
|-
| canoe || *kor || kor || kor || kor || kor || kor
|-
| house ||  || endau || endau || kak || tomuŋ || to
|-
| village ||  || n(a)oŋ || noŋ || auŋ || wunis || ŋuni
|-
| breast || *mɨr || mur || mur || mɨr || mɨr || mɨr
|-
| tooth || *nda(r) || ndakai || ndakai || ndar || dar || ndar
|-
| blood ||  || rumb || yakaind || rakaind || nimbit || rerik
|-
| bone || *ɣar || gagar || gagar || gagar || ɣar || ɣarɣar
|-
| tongue || *mi(m) || mi || memraŋ || mim || eitap || ɲjiekpun
|-
| ear || *kwar || kwar || kwar || kwar || kur || kur
|-
| eye || *rəmeak || namak || rameak || lamŋeak || rəmak || rəmaʔ
|-
| nose || *ŋgum || ŋgum || ŋgum || ŋgum || ŋgum || ŋgum
|-
| leg || *or ? || or || or || or || or || rue
|-
| hair ||  || mbunat || sabrit || yakwar || twakarɨ || dəmbar
|-
| egg ||  || yor || yor || lor || nuok || nuʔ
|-
| bird || *ŋgwarak || ŋgorak || ŋgorak || ŋgorak || gwarak || ŋgorak
|-
| leaf || *(ra)par || rapar || rapar || rapar || par || par
|-
| tree ||  || padoŋ || paraŋ || ik || kən || kən
|-
| yesterday || *ɣur || ŋur || ŋaup || ŋaur || ɣur || gur
|-
| tomorrow || *ɣurap ? || ŋarap || ŋorap || ŋorap || vuarap || gurap
|-
| oar || *anup || anup || anup || nup || nuap || nop
|-
| betelnut || *mbok || meɲjak || mbok || mbok || mbok || mbok
|-
| lime || *awi(r) || ai || aipak || avir || verpak || virwa
|-
| sago || *veak || wak || weak || veak || ves || vek
|-
| pig || *rəkəm || markum || markum || markəm || rəkəm || rəgəm
|-
| crocodile ||  || namkai || nomgai || mugmai || ŋgome || ŋgumi
|-
| snake || *ndop || mindop || mindop || nduop || ndup || kondok
|-
| name || *ɣi || wi || wi || i || ji || gi
|-
| mosquito || *ŋgit || naŋgit || naŋgit || ŋgit || ɲjet || ŋget
|-
| ground ||  || wakar || wakar || tiakar || tesin || terik
|-
| feces || *yu/o || yo || yupak || lo || yuwur || ɲjit
|-
| hear || *varak || warak || warak || warak || vai || vai
|-
| hit ||  || ruŋ || pi || pi || ŋara || ŋa
|-
| eat || *amb || amb || amb || amb || mba || mba
|-
| go || *saŋg || saŋg || saŋg || taŋg || saŋg || saŋg
|-
| come || *kɨp || rukup || rukup || kɨp || kɨp || kɨp
|-
| sit || *mbirak || mbirak || mbirak || mbirak || berak || mbirak
|-
| stand || *-tik || utik || utik || wɨtɨk || tis || tik
|-
| big ||  || nakan || aneak || aɲek || ɣor || vret
|-
| good || *ya(o)ŋ || yaoŋ || yaoŋ || laŋ || yaŋ || yandi
|-
| black || *mbəkmbək || mbukmbuk || mbukmbuk || mbəkmbək || bəkbək || mbəkmbək
|-
| hot ||  || wiwi || wai || ovai || vɨvi || gɨgɨr
|-
| cold ||  || gagau || gagau || gagau || ɣiɣiat || rivut
|}

Below, proto-Watam-Awar-Gamay is listed in comparison with four other Ramu languages that are closely related to, but not part of, Watam-Awar-Gamay: the Misegian languages Kire and Mikarew, and the Tanggu languages Tangu and Igom.

Proto-Watam-Awar-Gamay and Ramu comparisons (Foley 2005)

{| class="wikitable sortable"
! gloss !! proto-Watam-Awar-Gamay !! Kire !! Mikarew !! Tangu !! Igom
|-
| one || *kaku || ibabira || aməra || wunwan || unuʔaka
|-
| two || *mbuniŋ || pʰunini || poni || munai || mokupea
|-
| three ||  || pʰuni || pomənimkasam || munainwan || mokupea unuʔa
|-
| person || *namot || guma || guma || wanik || wuɣu
|-
| woman/mother ||  || mbik || aim/ami || məin || məin
|-
| father ||  || ndia || apisi || yavai || yap
|-
| water ||  || mbɨ || cup || niam || niam
|-
| fire || *s(u)ək || vap || ariv || ruwuv/rogup || lugu
|-
| sun || *ra(u) || ra || are || gar || ŋgar
|-
| moon || *kər(v)i || kəniŋ || ekini || mənam || mənam
|-
| star ||  || kam || mukope || riyɨndɨk || likian
|-
| canoe || *kor || kem || agiam ||  || 
|-
| house ||  || vun/pen || tɨpeŋ || taŋ || taŋ
|-
| village ||  || ŋgu || uŋip || məŋ || miaŋ
|-
| breast || *mɨr || ta || ote || ŋgyuav || gii
|-
| tooth || *nda(r) || thar || atarim || andar || dər
|-
| blood ||  || vusun || wusi || irien || məy
|-
| bone || *ɣar || xar || aɣar || ɣavaŋ || ɣavaŋ
|-
| tongue || *mi(m) || ze || mɨzm || mamiakɨ || mimiaŋ
|-
| ear || *kwar || kwar || kwar || wukwar || ɣukwar
|-
| eye || *rəmeak || rumaʔ || tama || raik || raik
|-
| nose || *ŋgum || kwom || winiba || munwam || eɲjia
|-
| leg || *or ? || ruu || sue || miɲaŋ || mbwan
|-
| hair ||  || rugun || tapanari || ɣasia/ŋgasia || rɨgesn
|-
| egg ||  || rer || aror || mɨnduapen || warɨan
|-
| bird || *ŋgwarak || kworak || kwara || ŋgwarak || ŋgwarak
|-
| leaf || *(ra)par || far || tafarim || rapar || pat
|-
| tree ||  || kʰa || tep || gək || ɣək
|-
| yesterday || *ɣur || gurmun || pɨkɨm || ruar || mugisi
|-
| tomorrow || *ɣurap ? || gurmun || kuromu || wumasan || mom
|-
| oar || *anup || (n)dab ||  ||  || iŋgap
|-
| betelnut || *mbok || puk || mis || miak || miak
|-
| lime || *awi(r) || rwi || iwim || uwuren || uɣum
|-
| sago || *veak || vik || wisim || giav/ŋiav || yaŋgia
|-
| pig || *rəkəm || dam || ta || ram || ram
|-
| crocodile ||  || kum || koa || viari || laisaŋ
|-
| snake || *ndop || kuruk || kuru || kyuok || kiak
|-
| name || *ɣi || zin || izi || rigiav || rigiaŋ
|-
| mosquito || *ŋgit || ket || ci || ŋgwan || gwan
|-
| ground ||  || nwiaʔan || ŋwas || nduv || ʃa
|-
| feces || *yu/o || vi(r) || buarim || gavig || miɲaŋ
|-
| hear || *varak || mbara? || orak || vara/bara || mwiari
|-
| hit ||  || soʔ || sos || ŋak || mənaramu
|-
| eat || *amb || mbɨ || tama || ɣam/mi || kam
|-
| go || *saŋg || vu/ŋgu || usi || maŋ/wugi || gi
|-
| come || *kɨp || zə || si/sa || iɣ/giji || karigi
|-
| sit || *mbirak || peraʔ || apria || ipi/pindi || pwiaŋge
|-
| stand || *-tik || tʰək || cu || ɣambi/ləmbe || rambia
|-
| big ||  || bakume || aruʔa || ruma/arum || arum
|-
| good || *ya(o)ŋ || vuŋ || aŋwi || swari/ara || yara
|-
| black || *mbəkmbək || pək || pək || ŋes/nəs || ŋiatʃ
|-
| hot ||  || qurgur || fei || uŋtiki || varip
|}

References

External links 

 Timothy Usher, New Guinea World, Proto–Ramu Coast

 
Lower Ramu languages
Languages of Madang Province